Ronald Pierce Ely (born June 21, 1938) is an American actor and novelist born in Hereford, Texas, and raised in Amarillo.

Ely is best known for having portrayed Tarzan in the 1966–1968 NBC series Tarzan and for playing the lead role in the film Doc Savage: The Man of Bronze (1975). He hosted the Miss America pageant telecast in 1980 and 1981.

Actor
Ely won the role of Tarzan in 1966 after playing supporting roles in films such as South Pacific (1958), as an airplane navigator, The Fiend Who Walked the West (1958) and The Remarkable Mr. Pennypacker (1959).

During the filming of Tarzan, Ely did virtually all of his stunts for the series, and suffered  two dozen major injuries in the process, including two broken shoulders and various lion bites.

Ely's height (6'4") and athletic build also won him the title role in the film Doc Savage: The Man of Bronze (1975), as well as various guest shots. He was in five episodes of the series Fantasy Island; in one, in 1978, Ely portrayed Mark Antony in a Roman military short tunic and breastplate. Also in 1978, Ely starred in the Wonder Woman television series two-part episode "The Deadly Sting."

Ely starred on the series The Aquanauts in 1960–1961, in the western adventure film The Night of the Grizzly (1966) opposite Clint Walker, and later appeared in Jürgen Goslar's slavery movie Slavers (1978). In the 1980s, he hosted the musical game show Face the Music, as well as the 1980 and 1981 Miss America Pageants, replacing longtime host Bert Parks. Later in the decade, Ely starred in a 1987–1988 revival of the 1960s adventure series Sea Hunt as Mike Nelson, the role played by Lloyd Bridges in the original series.

In the 1990s, Ely’s roles included a retired Superman from an alternative reality in the 1991 two-part episode "The Road to Hell" of the Superboy syndicated television series, and a big game hunter named Gordon Shaw in the 1992 episode "Tarzan the Hunted" of the syndicated Tarzán TV series (starring Wolf Larson). Until about 2001, Ely made appearances on such television shows as Sheena and Renegade.

Ely had retired from acting in 2001, but he returned to acting with an appearance in the television movie Expecting Amish (2014).

Writer
Ely embarked on a professional writing career and has authored two published mystery novels featuring private eye Jake Sands: Night Shadows (1994) and East Beach (1995).

Personal life
Ely married his high school sweetheart Janet in 1959. Both natives of Hereford, Texas, they stayed together until their divorce in July 1961. He later dated actresses Ursula Andress, Barbara Bouchet, Dyan Cannon and Britt Ekland. In 1984 he married former Miss Florida USA, Valerie Lundeen, and they had three children: Kirsten, Kaitland, and Cameron.

On October 15, 2019, Valerie was found stabbed to death at the Hope Ranch residential community along the Santa Barbara coast where the couple lived; Ron was unharmed.  Police were called to the scene for a "family disturbance", and a suspect identified as the couple's son Cameron was shot dead by police. In October 2020, Ely challenged the Santa Barbara District Attorney after the police's actions were described as justifiable homicide by the district attorney and no charges were filed against the deputies who were involved in the shooting.

Filmography

Film

Television

References

External links

 Ron Ely at Brian's Drive-In Theater
 

1938 births
Living people
American game show hosts
American male film actors
American male television actors
American male novelists
20th-century American novelists
Male actors from Texas
People from Amarillo, Texas
Amarillo High School alumni
20th-century American male writers